Abdoul Bandaogo (born 30 May 1998) is a Burkinabé professional footballer who plays as a midfielder for Belarusian Premier League club Dinamo Minsk and the Burkina Faso national team.

International career
On 9 October 2020, Bandaogo represented the Burkina Faso national team in a friendly 3-0 win over DR Congo.

References

External links

La Preferente Profile

1998 births
Living people
Sportspeople from Ouagadougou
Burkinabé footballers
Association football midfielders
Segunda División B players
Real Balompédica Linense footballers
Betis Deportivo Balompié footballers
C.D. Trofense players
FC Dinamo Minsk players
Burkinabé expatriate footballers
Burkinabé expatriate sportspeople in Spain
Expatriate footballers in Spain
Expatriate footballers in Portugal
Expatriate footballers in Belarus
Burkina Faso international footballers
21st-century Burkinabé people